Draga Ljočić Milošević (1855–1926), was a Serbian physician, socialist, and feminist. In 1872, she became the first Serbian woman to be accepted at the University of Zürich in Switzerland. During the war between Serbia and the Ottoman Empire, she worked as a medical assistant in the army and received the grade of a Lieutenant. In 1879, she graduated and thereby became the first Serbian female doctor in medicine. She was permitted to practice in Serbia in 1881. She was also a leading figure within the newly founded Serbian women's rights movement.Đura Ljočić, one of the earliest members of the People's Radical Party, was her brother.

She was also the first female doctor in the Balkan Wars and the Great War, and one of only a dozen women working as doctors in Europe at that time.

Tribute
On 22 February 2016, Google Doodle commemorated her 161st birthday.

Dissertation 
 Draga Ljocic: Ein Beitrag zur operativen Therapie der Fibromyome des Uterus, Zürich 1878, (Dissertation Universität Zürich 1878, 115 Seiten).

See also
 Maria Fjodorovna Zibold

References

1855 births
Serbian feminists
Serbian physicians
Serbian socialists
19th-century Serbian people
1926 deaths
Serbian women's rights activists
Socialist feminists
19th-century women physicians